Schizothorax sinensis is a species of ray-finned fish in the genus Schizothorax from the middle and upper parts of the Yangtze basin in China.

References

Schizothorax
Taxa named by Solomon Herzenstein
Fish described in 1889